William Reynolds (also Rainolds, Raynolds, Latin Reginaldus) (c.1544 at Pinhorn near Exeter – 24 August 1594 at Antwerp) was an English Roman Catholic theologian and Biblical scholar.

Life

Educated at Winchester School, he became fellow of New College, Oxford (1560–1572). He was converted to Catholicism partly by the controversy between John Jewel and Thomas Harding, and partly by the personal influence of William Allen.

In 1575 he made a public recantation in Rome, and two years later went to Douai to study for the priesthood. He removed with the other collegians from Douai to Reims in 1578 and was ordained priest at Châlons in April, 1580. He then remained at the college, lecturing on Scripture and Hebrew, and helping Gregory Martin in translating the Reims Testament.

Some years before his death he had left the college to become chaplain to the Beguines at Antwerp.

Works

He translated several of the writings of Allen and Harding into Latin and wrote a "Refutation" of William Whitaker's attack on the Reims version (Paris, 1583); "De justa reipublicæ christianæ in reges impios et hæreticos authoritate" (Paris, 1590), under the name of Rossæus; a treatise on the Blessed Sacrament (Antwerp, 1593); "Calvino-Turcismus" (Antwerp, 1597).

Family
He was the second son of Richard Rainolds, and elder brother of John Rainolds, one of the chief Anglican scholars engaged on the King James Bible.

See also

References

Attribution
 The entry cites:
Kirby, Annals of Winchester College (London, 1892); 
Foster, Alumni Oxonienses (Oxford. 1891); 
Douay Diaries (London, 1878); 
Anthony à Wood, Athenae Oxonienses (London, 1813); 
John Pitts, De illustribus Angliae scriptoribus (Paris, 1619); 
Charles Dodd, Church History, II (Brussels vere Wolverhampton, 1737–42); 
Joseph Gillow, in Biographical Dictionary of English Catholics, s. v.; 

1544 births
1594 deaths
Converts to Roman Catholicism
Beguines and Beghards
Fellows of New College, Oxford
Clergy from Exeter
16th-century English Roman Catholic priests
16th-century English Roman Catholic theologians